The thick-spined porcupine (Hystrix crassispinis) is a species of rodent in the family Hystricidae. It is endemic to the island of Borneo and found in Brunei, Indonesia, and Malaysia.

History
In 1996, the species was considered Near Threatened, but in 2008, this was lowered to Least Concern.

Distribution
It is found in a wide variety of habitats ranging from natural forest to agricultural areas, with an elevation distribution of sea level to at least .

Threats
Although this porcupine is hunted for food, it is not a concern due to its wide distribution and high tolerance for habitat changes.

References

Hystrix (mammal)
Rodents of Malaysia
Rodents of Indonesia
Mammals of Brunei
Endemic fauna of Borneo
Mammals of Borneo
Mammals described in 1877
Taxa named by Albert Günther
Taxonomy articles created by Polbot